Madrasi, also spelled as Madrassi, is a term used as a demonym and a regional slur for people from southern India, especially Tamil Nadu. In earlier usage it was a demonym to refer to the people of Madras Presidency; however this use of the term is now outdated. In present-day, the exonym Madrasi specifically refers to the people in living in Madras (officially called as Chennai), and the term Chennaite (or Chennaivasi) is the endonym for the people living in the city.

See also 

Tamils
Telugu vaaru

References

People from Chennai